Lieutenant General Willard Stewart Paul (February 28, 1894 – March 21, 1966) was a senior United States Army officer who commanded the 26th Infantry Division during World War II.

Early life and military career
He was born in Worcester, Massachusetts on February 28, 1894. He attended Clark University in Worcester, Massachusetts, and American University in Washington, D.C.

In 1916 Paul joined the Colorado Army National Guard as a second lieutenant in the Field Artillery Branch to serve on the Mexican border during the Pancho Villa Expedition.

He received a commission in the Regular Army in 1917, after the American entry into World War I. During the war he served at Camp Merritt, New Jersey. Like many others who became general officers in World War II, Paul did not serve overseas.

Between the wars
The war came to an end on November 11, 1918. Paul, remaining in the army during the interwar years, graduated from the Infantry School, Officers Course in 1921. From 1922 to 1924 he was assistant professor of military science for the Reserve Officer Training Corps program at Johns Hopkins University, from which he received a Bachelor of Science degree in 1924.

Paul was a 1930 graduate of the Infantry Officer Advanced Course, and was an instructor at the U.S. Army Infantry School from 1930 to 1933. He graduated from the U.S. Army Command and General Staff School in 1935, and the U.S. Army War College in 1937.

He was assigned to the staff of the Adjutant General's Department, 1937 to 1941, and in 1942 he received a Master of Arts degree from the American University.

World War II

In 1942, after the American entrance into World War II, Paul was assigned as Deputy Chief of Staff for Logistics, as a G-4 staff officer with Headquarters Army Ground Forces, receiving promotion to the one-star general officer rank of brigadier general on June 24, 1942.

He was promoted again, this time to the two-star rank of major general, on March 16, 1943. The following month he was made the first Commanding General (CG) of the 75th Infantry Division, an all-draftee division, during its stateside training. In August he then assumed command of the 26th Infantry Division, nicknamed the "Yankee Division", an Army National Guard formation recruiting from Massachusetts. He took over command from Major General Roger W. Eckfeldt, who had commanded the 26th Division for over three years. Paul led the 26th in numerous training exercises in the United States and was to command the division for the rest of the war.

Paul led the 26th Division overseas to the Western Front in late August 1944, arriving at Cherbourg, France in the European Theater of Operations (ETO) in early September 1944, three months after the Normandy landings. The 26th Division's first major action of the war was during the Battle of the Bulge towards the end of the year where it played an important role in the counterattack by Lieutenant General George Patton's Third Army that reduced the German salient. Earning praise from Patton, the 26th took part in the Western Allied invasion of Germany in March 1945 until the end of World War II in Europe in May.

For his services during the war Paul was twice awarded the Army Distinguished Service Medal, the Silver Star, and the Legion of Merit. The citation for his Silver Star reads:

Postwar

After the war Paul remained in Europe as Deputy Chief of Staff for Personnel, G-1, at Supreme Headquarters Allied Expeditionary Force (SHAEF).

In 1947 Paul was promoted to lieutenant general and returned to the United States as the army's Assistant Chief of Staff for Personnel, G-1, where served until his 1948 retirement. As the army's top personnel officer, he was responsible for its post-war manpower demobilization.

Paul's decorations included two awards of the Army Distinguished Service Medal and the Legion of Merit.

Civilian career
Following his retirement from the military he was a consultant for the American Red Cross, Assistant Director of the Office of Defense Mobilization, and a member of the subcommittee set up by the Hoover Commission to study personnel issues in the Department of Defense. Paul also served as President of the Retired Officers Association.

In 1956 he became President of Gettysburg College, where he remained until his 1961 retirement.  One of his acts as President of the college was to make space available for former President Dwight D. Eisenhower to maintain an office.

Retirement and death
Lieutenant General Willard Paul died at Walter Reed Army Hospital on March 21, 1966 and was buried in Section 30, Grave 1073 RH of Arlington National Cemetery, Virginia.

References

 Army List and Directory, U.S. Army Adjutant General's Office, 1919, page 140
 Johns Hopkins Half-Century Directory, 1926, page 275
 Newspaper article, President Names 23 Major Generals, New York Times, March 26, 1943
 Newspaper article, Paul Commands 26th Division, Hartford Courant, August 26, 1943
 Newspaper article, Heads Demobilization: Maj. Gen. W.S. Paul Is Made Assistant Chief of Staff, New York Times, October 27, 1945
 Newspaper article, General Paul to Retire Dec. 31, New York Times, November 10, 1948
 Military Times, Hall of Valor, Index of Recipients of the Distinguished Service Medal, http://www.homeofheroes.com/valor/02_awards/index_dsm/00_armyDSM-index.html
 Newspaper article, Gen. Paul to Join Red Cross, New York Times, January 16, 1949
 Scope and Content page, Willard S. Paul papers, Dwight D. Eisenhower Library, https://www.eisenhower.archives.gov/Research/Finding_Aids/PDFs/Paul_Willard_Papers.pdf
 Newspaper article, Hoover Names Group to Study Civil Service, Chicago Tribune, December 23, 1953
 The Hoover Report, 1953-1955: What It Means to You as Citizen and Taxpayer, 1956, page 313
 Gettysburg College web site, List of Presidents page, http://www.gettysburg.edu/about/college_history/president/
 Newspaper article, Officers Ask Pay Raise: Convention Seeks Increase In Retirement Compensation, New York Times, November 29, 1958
 Newspaper article, Willard S. Paul, General, 72, Dies, New York Times, March 22, 1966

External links

Generals of World War II

|-

1894 births
1966 deaths
United States Army Field Artillery Branch personnel
Military personnel from Massachusetts
People from Worcester, Massachusetts
Johns Hopkins University alumni
United States Army personnel of World War I
United States Army generals
Recipients of the Legion of Merit
Recipients of the Distinguished Service Medal (US Army)
American University alumni
Gettysburg College faculty
Burials at Arlington National Cemetery
United States Army War College alumni
Presidents of Gettysburg College
United States Army generals of World War II
United States Army Command and General Staff College alumni
20th-century American academics